Let's Have a Party in Prague is a studio album by American recording artist Wanda Jackson and European recording artist Karel Zich. It was released on the Supraphon label in 1988 and contained a total of 13 tracks. The album was a collection of Rockabilly songs released exclusively for the European market. It was Jackson's first collaborative studio album and Zich's second. One single was spawned from the album in 1988.

Background and content
Wanda Jackson was among the first women to have commercial success in both country music and Rockabilly (later known as rock and roll) music. Her singles included "Let's Have a Party", "In the Middle of a Heartache" and "The Box It Came In". She focused more on gospel music in the 1970s and recorded a series of albums for several spiritual labels. By the 1980s, her popularity had waned and she recalled feeling past her prime in her 2017 autobiography. However, in 1984, Jackson learned of Rockabilly's revival in Europe and recorded her first rock album in several decades the same year. Among the European rock projects she collaborated on was with Czech performer Karel Zich. 

Known as the "Iron Curtain Elvis", Zich's Rockabilly records found success in several eastern European countries. Jackson recalled in a 2005 interview first meeting Zich at a Czech airport and began recording an album shortly after. Let's Have a Party in Prague was recorded at the Supraphon studio in Prague, a capital of the Czech Republic. Sessions were held in May 1987 alongside producer Stanislav Chmelík who recorded 13 tracks with the pair. All of the songs were duets between both artists, including a re-working of Jackson's "Mean Mean Man", "Let's Have a Party" and "Right or Wrong". Zich contributed five self-composed songs to the project. Also included was a cover of Johnny Cash and June Carter's "Jackson".

Release
Let's Have a Party in Prague was released in 1988 on the Supraphon label, exclusively for the Czech market in Europe. It was originally issued as a vinyl LP, with seven songs on "Side A" and six songs on "Side B". It was also distributed with the same identification number as a compact disc. In addition, the disc was issued as a cassette, with songs on both sides of the tape. The album was Jackson's thirty second studio recording and Zich's tenth. Jackson's and Zich's "My Party" was spawned as the album's only single, which also occurred in 1988. The single was issued as a seven inch vinyl record, containing the duo's cover "Jackson" on the B-side. A year following the album's original release, it sold an estimated 220,000 copies in Czechoslovakia. In 1990, the album certified gold in sales in the nation.

Track listings

Vinyl and cassette versions

Compact disc version

Personnel
All credits are adapted from the liner notes of Let's Have a Party in Prague.

Musical and technical personnel
 Vlastimila Brčáková – Translator
 Michal Bukovič – Supervisor (editor)
 Stanislav Chmelík – Arranger, producer
 Wanda Jackson – Lead vocals
 Milan Kincl – Design 
 Vít Popp – Recording Supervisor 
 Josef Spěváček – Sleeve Notes 
 Karel Zich – Lead vocals

Release history

References

1988 albums
Wanda Jackson albums